Tyree Glenn, born William Tyree Glenn (November 23, 1912, Corsicana, Texas, United States, – May 18, 1974, Englewood, New Jersey), was an American trombone and vibraphone player.

Biography
Tyree played trombone and vibraphone with local Texas bands before moving in the early 1930s to Washington, D.C., where he performed with several prominent bands of the swing era. He played with Bob Young (1930), and then he joined Tommy Myles's band (1934–36).
After he left Myles, he moved to the West Coast, playing with groups headed by Charlie Echols (1936). Further, he played with Eddie Barefield (1936), Eddie Mallory's band (1937) and Benny Carter (1937) and played with Cab Calloway from 1939 to 1946.

He toured Europe with Don Redman's big band (1946). From 1947 to 1951, he played with Duke Ellington as a wah-wah trombonist in the style originating with Tricky Sam Nanton and Ellington's only vibraphonist, being well-featured on the Liberian Suite. After, he played also with Howard Biggs's Orchestra.

During the 1950s, Glenn did studio work, led his quartet at the Embers, did some television, radio and acting work, and freelanced in swing and Dixieland settings. In 1953, he joined Jack Sterling's New York daily radio show, with which he remained until 1963. During 1965–68, he toured the world with Louis Armstrong's All-Stars and played until Armstrong died in 1971. Later, Glenn led his own group during his last few years.

He was also a studio musician and actor. He wrote "Sultry Serenade", which was recorded by Duke Ellington and Erroll Garner. With a lyric added by Allan Roberts, this song became known as "How Could You Do a Thing Like That to Me?" and was recorded by Frank Sinatra.

Glenn lived in Englewood, New Jersey, where he died of cancer at the age of 61. He was survived by two sons, Tyree Jr., and Roger, both musicians.

Discography
1957: At the Embers
1958: Tyree Glenn at the Roundtable
1958: Tyree Glenn's at the London House
1959: Try A Little Tenderness – Tyree Glenn with Strings
1960: Let’s Have a Ball – The Tyree Glenn Quintet
1961: At the London House in Chicago
1962: Trombone Artistry
With Louis Bellson and Gene Krupa
The Mighty Two (Roulette, 1963)
With Buck Clayton
All the Cats Join In (Columbia 1956)
With Jack Sterling Quintet
Cocktail Swing (Harmony-Columbia, 1959)
With Clark Terry
Duke with a Difference (Riverside, 1957)

Awards
Independent Music Awards 2013: Satchmo at the National Press Club: Red Beans and Rice-ly Yours - Best Reissue Album

References

1912 births
1974 deaths
American jazz trombonists
Male trombonists
Duke Ellington Orchestra members
Musicians from Texas
People from Corsicana, Texas
People from Englewood, New Jersey
20th-century American musicians
Deaths from cancer
20th-century trombonists
American male jazz musicians
The Cab Calloway Orchestra members
20th-century American male musicians
American jazz vibraphonists